Xplosion was a professional wrestling television program that was produced by the Impact Wrestling promotion. Launched in 2002, the show featured highlights from Impact's flagship television program, exclusive taped matches, and other content. It was mainly produced for international markets, though in its later years, episodes would be distributed in the United States on Impact Plus. 

The show was cancelled in 2021, after almost twenty years of broadcast, and its final episode aired on March 6, 2021. It was replaced by Before the Impact, which premiered two weeks prior. As of 2021, archived episodes are broadcast in Africa and India.

Format and history

2002–2010
Xplosion was launched on November 27, 2002, as the promotion's first, and only, regular cable show. In its original format, the show featured exclusive matches from the TNA Asylum, as well as exclusive interviews with all the roster and personalities.

On November 18, 2004, Xplosion was revamped as a recap of the previous week's Impact! episode in light of alterations in the taping schedule. The show would resume airing exclusive matches (billed as "Xplosion Xclusives") once more on October 7, 2005, in addition to recapping Impact!. These matches also aired on the TNA Global Impact! web show.  "Xplosion Xclusives" matches normally featured wrestlers who rarely appeared during regular Impact! episodes. Occasionally, wrestlers may have made their debut or return on Xplosion and angles also took place.

Airings of Xplosion in the United States ceased at the end of 2006, although some of the exclusive matches could be seen on TNA Today. Starting on December 22, 2008, "Xplosion Xclusive" matches were also streamed on the prmotion's website and YouTube channel.

2010–2017
Xplosion was revamped at the June 14, 2010, tapings of its 300th episode, now featuring more original matches with Jeremy Borash and Mike Tenay on commentary. In addition to the format changes, Xplosion received a new logo, graphics package and theme music performed by Taproot. The show would also feature a segment called "Spin Cycle", where Borash had a Q&A session with various TNA stars in front of a live crowd. 

In 2013, Xplosion began including matches from the promotion's early years and matches prior to the upcoming PPV event. Beginning in December of that year, Rockstar Spud replaced long term color commentator Mike Tenay, who thereafter stood in for Spud in 2014 from time to time when Spud could not make certain tapings.

Xplosion would be revamped again with the May 31, 2014, episode with families in mind, as it was airing on Saturday mornings in the United Kingdom.

2017–2021 
In early 2017, as the promotion officially changed its name to Impact Wrestling, the show gradually became known as simply Xplosion (and later, Impact Xplosion  ) and also dropped the TNA branding to reflect this change. On October 10, 2017, Xplosion launched on Global Wrestling Network, making the program available in the U.S. for the first time since 2006. By 2019, the show was streaming on Wednesdays 7PM ET on Impact Wrestling's Twitch channel and Impact Plus. 

On March 3, 2021, PWinsider reported that production had halted on new Xplosion episodes. Later that month, it was reported in Wrestling Observer Newsletter that the show had been cancelled to focus on Before the Impact.

See also
 TNA Xplosion Championship Challenge

References

External links

Xplosion
2002 American television series debuts
English-language television shows
First-run syndicated television programs in the United States
2021 American television series endings